John Maddox (born 30 December 1930) is an Australian former cricketer. He played eight first-class matches for Tasmania between 1951 and 1957.

See also
 List of Tasmanian representative cricketers

References

External links
 

1930 births
Living people
Australian cricketers
Tasmania cricketers
Cricketers from Tasmania